The 1906 Cork Senior Football Championship was the 20th staging of the Cork Senior Football Championship since its establishment by the Cork County Board in 1887.

Fermoy were the defending champions.

On 10 March 1907, Fermoy won the championship following an 0–08 to 0–00 defeat of Carbery Rangers in the final. This was their sixth championship title overall and their second title in succession.

Results

Final

References

Cork Senior Football Championship